Sylke Otto (born 7 July 1969 in Karl-Marx-Stadt) is a former German luger who competed from 1991 to 2007. Competing in three Winter Olympics, she won the gold medal in the women's singles event in 2002 and 2006.

Otto won twelve medals at the FIL World Luge Championships with six golds (Women's singles: 2000, 2001, 2003, 2005; Mixed team: 2003, 2005), three silvers (Mixed team: 1997, 2000, 2001), and three bronzes (Women's singles: 1999, 2004; Mixed team: 1999).

She also won eight medals at the FIL European Luge Championships with five golds (Women's singles: 2000, 2002; Mixed team: 1990, 1992, 2000), two silvers (Women's singles: 1992, Mixed team: 2002), and one bronze (Women's singles: 2004). Otto finished in the top three of the Luge World Cup standings every year from 1999 to 2006, winning the overall title four times (1994-5, 1999–2000, 2002-3, 2003-4). She won a record 37 World Cup races in total during her career.

Retirement
She retired from the sport on 12 January 2007 due to pregnancy. It was also due to a crash suffered at Königssee, Germany the previous week followed by watching the crash of Russia's Albert Demtschenko at Oberhof, Germany that same week. Otto had initially planned on retiring at the World Luge Championships in Igls, Austria (Located southeast of Innsbruck) in February, but her and Demtschenko's accident changed that. She has one daughter Sina born on 29 May 2007. A retirement ceremony for Otto took place prior to the start of the women's singles event at the 2008 FIL World Luge Championships in Oberhof, Germany on 25 January.

Other information
Otto was one of the torch bearers for the 2004 Summer Olympics in Athens, Greece as it traveled through Berlin, Germany.

References
FIL-Luge profile
FIL-Luge.org January 23, 2008 article on Otto's retirement ceremony prior to the start of the women's singles event at the 2008 FIL World Luge Championships in Oberhof, Germany on January 25, 2008. - Accessed January 24, 2008.
FIL-Luge.org 2 July 2004 article on Otto's torch carrying in Berlin prior to the 2004 Summer Olympics. - accessed March 7, 2008.
Fuzilogik Sports - Winter Olympic results - Women's luge
Hickoksports.com results on Olympic champions in luge and skelton.
Hickok sports information on World champions in luge and skeleton.
List of European luge champions 
List of women's singles luge World Cup champions since 1978.
NBC biography
Official website 
SportQuick.com information on World champions in luge.

External links
 
 
 

1969 births
Living people
German female lugers
Olympic lugers of Germany
Olympic gold medalists for Germany
Olympic medalists in luge
Lugers at the 1992 Winter Olympics
Lugers at the 2002 Winter Olympics
Lugers at the 2006 Winter Olympics
Medalists at the 2002 Winter Olympics
Medalists at the 2006 Winter Olympics
Sportspeople from Chemnitz